Exchangeable bond (or XB) is a type of hybrid security consisting of a straight bond and an embedded option to exchange the bond for the stock of a company other than the issuer (usually a subsidiary or company in which the issuer owns a stake) at some future date and under prescribed conditions. An exchangeable bond is different from a convertible bond. A convertible bond gives the holder the option to convert bond into shares of the issuer.

The pricing of an exchangeable bond is similar to that of convertible bond, splitting it in straight debt part and an embedded option part and valuing the two separately.

Pricing

Price of exchangeable bond = price of straight bond + price of option to exchange
 Price of an exchangeable bond is always higher than the price of a straight bond because the option to exchange adds value to an investor.
 Yield on an exchangeable bond is lower than the yield on a straight bond.

References

External links

Fixed income analysis
Debt
Commercial bonds
Embedded options